Matthew "Mat" Collishaw Hon. FRPS (born 6 January 1966) is an English artist based in London.

Collishaw's work uses photography and video. His best known work is Bullet Hole (1988), which is a closeup photo of what appears to be a bullet hole wound in the scalp of a person's head, mounted on 15 light boxes. Collishaw took the original image from a pathology textbook that actually showed a wound caused by an ice pick. Bullet Hole was originally exhibited in Freeze, the group show organised by Damien Hirst in 1988 that launched the YBA (Young British Artists). It is now in the collection of the Museum of Old and New Art in Hobart, Australia.

Critical response
Jonathan Jones wrote in an interview with the artist in The Guardian of Collishaw's 2013 exhibition at Arter, Istanbul;  ‘A show that foregrounds his political conscience in powerful works such as Last Meal On Death Row. For me, Collishaw is a good political artist for the same reason he is a good religious artist and a good artist-artist. It is because he believes in the efficacy of images. Not for him the abstract evasion, the minimalist half smile... he wants to punch your imagination in the stomach. He justifies the art of sensation by showing how it can have depth in its oomph.’

Collishaw's seminal artwork, All Things Fall, received widespread acclaim, notably by The Sunday Times writer and art critic Waldemar Januszczak, who wrote; ‘You walk in, and before you is a model of a classical temple, circular, domed, becolumned, around which hundreds of nude figures have been arranged in cryptic poses. What they are doing is unclear. But it seems to be something nasty. Suddenly the lights dip and the temple begins to spin. Faster and faster it goes, until the figures crowded around it jump into action, like drawings in a flipbook, and you have before you a remarkable re-creation of the Massacre of the Innocents, the biblical murder of every newborn boy ordered, at Christmas, by Herod. The sudden burst of unexpected violence is brilliantly paced, brilliantly achieved, in an artwork that is nothing less than a contemporary masterpiece.’

The exhibition The Centrifugal Soul, at Blain|Southern Gallery, London in 2017 received notable praise, in particular critic Gaby Wood wrote of the work, Albion for The Telegraph; ‘...the fact that he can convert such abstract ideas into works that are elegant and entertaining makes him, uniquely among artists and thinkers so far this century, a cross between an aesthetic philosopher and a magician.’

Collishaw's first venture into VR, with his exhibition Thresholds in 2017, was reviewed by Laurie Taylor for frieze Magazine: "Collishaw has not recreated an historical experience, but has instead constructed an entirely new one. The end product is ultimately Collishaw’s vision and it teems with the reverence he has not only for the wonder of photography, but also for the power of its illusions."

Influences
British pathologist, Austin Gresham, wrote a handbook, A Colour Atlas of Forensic Pathology, in 1975. Collishaw said it became "the Britart bible", as a source for explicit images of dead bodies for artwork.

Personal life
Collishaw was born in Nottingham. He was raised in a Dawn Christadelphian family.

In 2015, he was named one of GQ's 50 best dressed British men.

Collishaw is married to Polly Morgan with whom he has two sons.

Bibliography
Mat Collishaw, Thomas Dane, Jon Thompson, Artimo Foundation Breda, 1997.
Mat Collishaw, Neal Brown, Jason Beard, Other Criteria, London, 2007.
Mat Collishaw: Insecticides, Nina Miall, Haunch of Venison, London, 2012.
Mat Collishaw: Ou l'horreur délicieuse, Paul Ardenne, Régis Durand, Julie Gil, Federica Martini, Barbara Polla, Michele Robecchi, Le Bord de l'eau, Brussels, 2013
Mat Collishaw, Sue Hubbard, Rachel Campbell-Johnson, Blain|Southern, London, 2013.
Mat Collishaw: Afterimage, Başak Doğa Temür, Arter, Istanbul, 2013.
Mat Collishaw: Black Mirror, Anna Coliva, Valentina Ciarallo and Andrew Graham-Dixon, Galleria Borghese, Rome, 2014.
The Centrifugal Soul, Waldemar Januszczak, James Parry, Blain|Southern, London, 2017.
Thresholds, Eşikler, Istanbul, 2018.
Standing Water, Petr Nedoma, Galerie Rudolfinum, Prague, 2018.

Exhibitions

Solo exhibitions
2008 Mat Collishaw Deliverance, Tanya Bonakdar Gallery, New York City, US.
2008 Mat Collishaw: Shooting Stars, Haunch of Venison, London, UK.
2009 Hysteria, Freud Museum, London, UK.
2009 Submission, Haunch of Venison, Berlin, DE.
2010 Retrospectre, British Film Institute, London, UK.
2010 Creation Condemned, Blain|Southern, London, UK.
2010 Shooting Stars & The Garden of Unearthly Delights, Void Gallery, Derry, IE.
2010 Magic Lantern, Victoria & Albert Museum, London, UK.
2010 Last Meal on Death Row, Analix Forever, Geneva, CH.
2011 Pearls of the Abyss, Analix Forever, Geneva, CH.
2012 Vitacide, Tanya Bonakdar Gallery, New York City, US.
2012 Sordid Earth, Greenaway Art Gallery, Kent Town, AU.
2012 The End of Innocence, Dilston Grove, CGP London Gallery, London, UK.
2012 Crystal Gaze, Raucci/Santamaria Gallery, Naples, IT.
2013 This is Not an Exit, Blain|Southern, London, UK.
2013 La vie de château, Château des Adhémar - Centre d'Art Contemporain, Montélimar, FR.
2014 Black Mirror, Galleria Borghese, Rome. 
2014 Mat Collishaw, Unosunove, Rome, IT. 
2014 Mat Collishaw, Patricia Low Contemporary, Gstaad, CH. 
2014 Mat Collishaw: The Yielding Glass, An Gailearaí, Ghaoth Dobhair, Donegal, Ireland. 
2015 In Camera, Library of Birmingham, Birmingham, UK. 
2015 Mat Collishaw, New Art Gallery Walsall, UK. 
2016 Folly ! Fountains Relief, Fountains Abbey & Studley Royal, North Yorkshire, UK. 
2017 Mat Collishaw, Thresholds, Somerset House, London; Birmingham Museum and Art Gallery, Birmingham; Lacock Abbey, Wiltshire, UK. 
2017 The Centrifugal Soul, Blain|Southern London, UK. 
2018 Thresholds, Somerset House, London, UK. 
2018 Thresholds, National Science and Media Museum, Bradford, UK. 
2018 Thresholds, Yapı Kredi Kültür Sanat Yayıncılık A.Ş., Istanbul, TR.
2018 Albion, Gary Tatintsian Gallery, Moscow, RU. 
2018 The Grinders Cease, Blain|Southern, Berlin, DE. 
2018 Mat Collishaw, The Mask of Youth, Queen’s House, Royal Museums Greenwich, London, UK. 
2018 Mat Collishaw, Standing Water, Galerie Rudolfinum, Prague, CZ. 
2018 Mat Collishaw, The Centrifugal Soul, Castle Howard, Yorkshire, UK. 
2018 Night Hunter, Robilant + Voena, St. Moritz, CH.
2019 The End of Innocence, Fundació Sorigué, Lleida, ES. 
2019 The Nerve Rack, Ushaw College, Durham, UK. 
2019 Deep State of Rapture, (with Mustafa Hulusi), Page Gallery, Seoul, KR.
2019 Dialogues, Villanueva Pavilion, Real Jardín Botánico, Madrid, ES. 
2020 The Adoration of the Mystic Lamb, St. Nicholas’ Church Korenmarkt, Ghent, BE. 
2020 Mat Collishaw, Djanogly Gallery, Lakeside Arts, Nottingham, UK.
2022 Zone of Machines, Gary Tatintsian Gallery, Inc., Moscow, Russia.

Group exhibitions
2007 The Tempest - Mat Collishaw and Paul Fryer, Gervasuti Foundation, Venice Biennale, Venice, IT.
2007 Mat Collishaw, Anthony Goicolea, Haunch of Venison, Zurich, CH.
2007 Les Fleurs du Mal, Arcos Sannio Contemporary Art Museum, Benevento, IT.
2009 Mythologies, Haunch of Venison, Zurich, CH.
2009 Distortion, Gervasuti Foundation, Venice Biennale, Venice, IT.
2010 Mat Collishaw, Tracey Emin & Paula Rego, Founding Museum, London, UK.
2010 Extraordinary measures, Belsay Castle, Northumbria, UK.
2010 Locus Solus, Benaki Museum, Athens, GR.
2011 House of Beasts, Attingham Park, National Trust, UK.
2011 Otherworldly: Optical Delusions and Small Realities, Museum of Arts and Design, New York, US.
2011 Sordid Earth, Roundhouse, London, UK.
2011 Memories of the Future, The Olbricht Collection, La Maison Rouge, Paris, FR.
2012 Out of Focus: Photography, Saatchi Gallery, London, UK.
2012 Des Images, Des Histoires, Maison de Jacques Coeur, Paris, FR.
2012 Britain Creates 2012: Fashion + Art Collusion, Victoria & Albert Museum, London, UK.
2012 White Light/White Heat: Contemporary Artists & Glass, Wallace Collection, London, UK.
2022   true city, custard factory Digbeth, Birmingham UK.

Awards
2018: Honorary Fellowship of the Royal Photographic Society, Bath

References

External links 
 
 Film about 2010 joint exhibition with Tracey Emin and Paula Rego at the Foundling Museum - The Guardian
 Interview of Collishaw (September 2012) at [REVma -/+]
 
 Artist's page at Gary Tatintsian Gallery

1966 births
Living people
21st-century British artists
English contemporary artists
Artists from Nottingham
Young British Artists